Start of a Romance is the ninth album by the New York-based R&B/soul band Skyy.  After a three-year hiatus from the charts, the group appeared to have already passed their peak.  However, this album became a major comeback success for the group, featuring two number 1 R&B singles, the title track ("Start of a Romance") and "Real Love."  "Real Love" also returned Skyy to the pop charts, where it became a top-50 hit.

An additional single, released between the two above mentioned tunes, "Love All the Way" also became a top-50 R&B hit.

The album itself peaked at #16 on the R&B album charts, Skyy's highest placement in this domain since their most successful album, Skyy Line topped the chart in 1982.  It also peaked at #155 on the pop album charts.

Track listing

References

1989 albums
Skyy (band) albums
Atlantic Records albums
Soul albums by American artists